Thomas Midgley may refer to:

 Thomas Midgley (footballer) (1856–1957), English footballer
 Thomas Midgley Jr. (1889–1944), American chemist